Anek is a 2022 Indian Hindi-language action thriller film written and directed by Anubhav Sinha who also co-produced it with T-Series. The film revolves around a government police secret agent official (played by Khurrana), who is sent to the Northeast region of India to bring a peace deal between the government and the separatist groups in the North East, who also want to break away from India. It stars Ayushmann Khurrana, Andrea Kevichüsa, Manoj Pahwa, Kumud Mishra and J. D. Chakravarthy. Anek was released in worldwide cinemas on 27 May 2022 to generally mixed to positive response from the critics with praise for its performances and themes but it received criticism for its screenplay and denseness.

Cast 
 Ayushmann Khurrana as Agent Aman / Joshua
 Andrea Kevichüsa as Aido
 Manoj Pahwa as Abrar 
 Kumud Mishra as Abrar's boss
 J. D. Chakravarthy as Anjaiyyah Bellamkonda IPS
 Loitongbam Dorendra Singh as Tiger Sangha
 Thejasevor Belho as Niko
 Rajib Kro as Johnson
 Sheila Devi as Emma
 Meenakshi as Gopa

Production 
Filming begun on 2 February 2021 and wrapped up within March 2021.

Music

The music rights of the film are owned by T-Series. The music of the film is composed by Anurag Saikia. The first single was released on 24 May 2022.

Release

Theatrical
The film was released in theatres worldwide on 27 May 2022.

Home media
The digital streaming rights of the film is owned by Netflix. The film streamed on Netflix from 26 June 2022.

Reception
Anek received mixed to positive reviews from critics with praise for performances and timely themes but received criticism for its screenplay and direction.

A critic for The Times of India rated the film 4 out of 5 stars and wrote "Anek, through its runtime, draws subtle parallels between the northeast and other parts of the country, in particular Jammu and Kashmir". Tina Das of The Print rated the film 4 out of 5 stars and wrote "Anek manages to showcase the complex layers of the insurgency in the Northeast, and it does that well". Phuong Le of The Guardian rated the film 4 out of 5 stars and wrote "Anek is a rare commercial film that spotlights Northeastern Indian stories, and goes out of its way to refuse to condemn guerrilla fighters as terrorists". Devesh Sharma of Filmfare rated the film 3.5 out of 5 stars and wrote "The political message packs a punch, its power is somewhat diminished by the execution and the writing, which is rusty in places". Navneet Vyasan of News 18 rated the film 3 out of 5 stars and wrote "If it wasn't for its cast, Anubhav Sinha's directorial 'Anek' would've been a test of your patience. Thankfully, it isn't". Swati Chopra of The Quint rated the film 3 out of 5 stars and wrote "Anek is preachy in parts, but the film has its heart in the right place and it could have done better if the film didn't feel rushed, leading to less clarity". Fengyen Chiu of Mashable rated the film 3 out of 5 stars and wrote "Anek tries very hard to bring forth the problems of North-east people in India but the message doesn't quite reach properly".

Nandini Ramnath of Scroll.in rated the film 2.5 out of 5 stars and wrote "Anek is sharper playing principled dissenter than uninvited saviour of the North East. Sukanya Verna of Rediff rated the film 2.5 out of 5 stars and wrote "There's too much going on in Anek, and a lot of it is terribly disjointed". Shubhra Gupta of The Indian Express rated the film 2.5 out of 5 stars and wrote "Ayushmann Khurrana and the film stay woolly, being careful to stay in the middle of the while-on-the-one-side, but-also tightrope. Anubhav Sinha dips his toe into relatively unexplored territory, with mixed results". Bharathi Pradhan of Lehren rated the film 2.5 out of 5 stars and wrote "The cinematic effort to mainstream the North-East, ends up in a mess that further alienates instead of integrating". Anna M. M. Vetticad of Firstpost rated the film 2 out of 5 stars and wrote "Visually spectacular, politically blurred, well-meaning and yet Anek fails to reach out across the barrier of the screen". Umesh Punwani of Koimoi rated the film 2 out of 5 stars and wrote "Anubhav Sinha had so much to showcase, but he chose the wrong platform to do so". Monika Rawal Kukreja of The Hindustan Times stated "Anubhav Sinha's latest political-social drama starring Ayushmann Khurrana fails to keep up with the expectations sets by Thappad, Mulk, Article 15".

See also
 List of Hindi films of 2022

References

External links 
 

2020s Hindi-language films
2022 action thriller films
Indian action thriller films
Indian sports films
Films about racism
Films about violence against women
Insurgency in Northeast India
Films about Naxalism
2020s sports films
2020s action thriller films